Faleia ( or ;  or ) is a village in the Paphos District of Cyprus, located 3 km south of Agios Fotios. Prior to 1974, it was inhabited exclusively by about 200 Turkish Cypriots. , only 2 people lived in Faleia. The village is now in a desolate state.

References

Communities in Paphos District